Edge of Tomorrow is the fourth album by Sunstorm featuring singer Joe Lynn Turner. It was released on May 13, 2016 via Frontiers Records, four years after Emotional Fire in 2012. This is the first album with Italian multi-instrumentalist Alessandro Del Vecchio (Hardline, Jorn, Edge of Forever) on producing, songwriting and keyboards and Italian musicians Simone Mularoni (DGM) on guitars, Nik Marzucchoni (Labyrith) on bass guitar and the only one to feature Francesco Jovino (Voodoo Circle, Jorn) on drums.

The album was preceded by the singles "The Sound of Goodbye" on March 16, "Edge of Tomorrow" on April 12, "Everything You've Got" on April 29 and "Don't Walk Away from a Goodbye" on May 5, 2016.

Track listing

Personnel
Sunstorm
Joe Lynn Turner - vocals
Alessandro Del Vecchio - keyboards, Hammond organ, backing vocals, producing, recording, mixing, mastering
Simone Mularoni - guitars
Nik Mazzucconi - bass guitar
Francesco Jovino - drums

Additional personnel
Serafino Perugino - executive producer
Mattia Stancioiu - production assistant
Giulio Cataldo - art director
Nello Dell'Omo - artwork

References

2016 albums
Sunstorm (band) albums
Frontiers Records albums